Powdered milk, also called milk powder, dried milk, or dry milk, is a manufactured dairy product made by evaporating milk to dryness. One purpose of drying milk is to preserve it; milk powder has a far longer shelf life than liquid milk and does not need to be refrigerated, due to its low moisture content. Another purpose is to reduce its bulk for the economy of transportation. Powdered milk and dairy products include such items as dry whole milk, nonfat (skimmed) dry milk, dry buttermilk, dry whey products and dry dairy blends.  Many exported dairy products conform to standards laid out in Codex Alimentarius.

Powdered milk is used for food as an additive, for health (nutrition), and also in biotechnology (saturating agent).

History and manufacture

While Marco Polo wrote of Mongolian Tatar troops in the time of Kublai Khan who carried sun-dried skimmed milk as "a kind of paste", the first modern production process for dried milk was invented by the Russian doctor Osip Krichevsky in 1802. The first commercial production of dried milk was organized by the Russian chemist M. Dirchoff in 1832. In 1855, T. S. Grimwade took a patent on a dried milk procedure, though a William Newton had patented a vacuum drying process as early as 1837.

In modern times, powdered milk is usually made by spray drying nonfat skimmed milk, whole milk, buttermilk or whey. Pasteurized milk is first concentrated in an evaporator to approximately 50 percent milk solids. The resulting concentrated milk is then sprayed into a heated chamber where the water almost instantly evaporates, leaving fine particles of powdered milk solids.

Alternatively, the milk can be dried by drum drying. Milk is applied as a thin film to the surface of a heated drum, and the dried milk solids are then scraped off. However, powdered milk made this way tends to have a cooked flavour, due to caramelization caused by greater heat exposure.

Another process is freeze drying, which preserves many nutrients in milk, compared to drum drying.

The drying method and the heat treatment of the milk as it is processed alters the properties of the milk powder, such as its solubility in cold water, its flavour, and its bulk density.

Food and health uses

Powdered milk is frequently used in the manufacture of infant formula, confectionery such as chocolate and caramel candy, and in recipes for baked goods where adding liquid milk would render the product too thin. Powdered milk is also widely used in various sweets such as the Indian milk balls known as gulab jamun and a popular Indian sweet delicacy (sprinkled with desiccated coconut) known as chum chum (made with skim milk powder).  Many no-cook recipes that use nut butters use powdered milk to prevent the nut butter from turning liquid by absorbing the oil.

Powdered milk is also a common item in UN food aid supplies, fallout shelters, warehouses, and wherever fresh milk is not a viable option. It is widely used in many developing countries because of reduced transport and storage costs (reduced bulk and weight, no refrigerated vehicles). Like other dry foods, it is considered nonperishable and is favored by survivalists, hikers, and others requiring nonperishable, easy-to-prepare food.

Because of its resemblance to cocaine and other drugs, powdered milk is sometimes used in filmmaking as a non-toxic prop that may be insufflated.

Reconstitution
The weight of nonfat dry milk (NFDM) to use is about 10% of the water weight. Alternatively, when measuring by volume rather than weight, one cup of fluid milk from powdered milk requires one cup of water and one-third cup of powdered milk.

Nutritional value
Milk powders contain all 21 standard amino acids, the building blocks of proteins, and are high in soluble vitamins and minerals. According to USAID, the typical average amounts of major nutrients in the unreconstituted nonfat dry milk are (by weight) 36% protein, 52% carbohydrates (predominantly lactose), calcium 1.3%, potassium 1.8%. Whole milk powder, on the other hand, contains on average 25–27% protein, 36–38% carbohydrates, 26–40% fat, and 5–7% ash (minerals). In Canada, powdered milk must contain added vitamin D in an amount such that a reasonable daily intake of the milk will provide between 300 and 400  International units (IU) of vitamin D. However, inappropriate storage conditions, such as high relative humidity and high ambient temperature, can significantly degrade the nutritive value of milk powder.

Commercial milk powders are reported to contain oxysterols (oxidized cholesterol) in higher amounts than in fresh milk (up to 30 μg/g, versus trace amounts in fresh milk).
Oxysterols are derivatives of cholesterol that are produced either by free radicals or by enzymes. Some free radicals-derived oxysterols have been suspected of being initiators of atherosclerotic plaques. For comparison, powdered eggs contain even more oxysterols, up to 200 μg/g.

Export market
 
As of 2020, the largest producers of milk powder are Europe, New Zealand, China, United States and Brazil.

European production of milk powder in fiscal year 2019–2020 was estimated at around 3.0 million tonnes of which the main volume was exported in bulk packing or consumer packs.

Australia also has a significant milk powder export industry, exporting over 13,000 tonnes of skim and whole milk powder in fiscal year 2020–2021, to a value of approximately AUD $83 000 000.

Brands on the market include Nido, from the company Nestlé, Incolac from the company Milcobel, Dutch Lady from FrieslandCampina and Puck from Arla Foods.

Some of the largest businesses in the industry are Nestlé, Danone, Lactalis, Fonterra, FrieslandCampina, Dean Foods, Arla Foods, Dairy Farmers of America, Kraft Foods, Saputo, and Parmalat.

Adulteration
In the 2008 Chinese milk scandal, melamine adulterant was found in Sanlu infant formula, added to fool tests into reporting higher protein content. Thousands became ill, and some children died, after consuming the product.

Contamination scare
In August 2013, China temporarily suspended all milk powder imports from New Zealand, after a scare where botulism-causing bacteria was falsely detected in several batches of New Zealand-produced whey protein concentrate. As a result of the product recall, the New Zealand dollar slipped by 0.8% (to 77.78 US cents) based on expected losses in sales from this single commodity.

Use in biotechnology
Fat-free powdered milk is used as a saturating agent to block nonspecific binding sites on supports like blotting membranes (nitrocellulose, polyvinylidene fluoride (PVDF) or nylon), preventing binding of further detection reagents and subsequent background. It may be referred as Blotto. The major protein of milk, casein, is responsible for most of the binding site saturation effect.

See also

Baked milk
Coconut milk powder
Condensed milk
Convenience food
Creamer
Evaporated milk
 Fat content of milk
Food powder
Instant breakfast
List of dried foods
Pomazánkové máslo
Powdered eggs
Scalded milk
Malted milk

Notes

References

External links

Instant foods and drinks
Dried foods
Milk
Russian inventions
Food powders